Lawrence Allen Jones (born March 4, 1951) is a former American football wide receiver in the National Football League (NFL) for the New York Giants, the Washington Redskins, and the San Francisco 49ers.  He played college football at Truman State University.

References

1951 births
Living people
American football wide receivers
Truman Bulldogs football players
New York Giants players
San Francisco 49ers players
Washington Redskins players
People from Lemoore, California
Players of American football from California